Wiedau is a river of Lower Saxony, Germany. It is a left-hand tributary of the Wümme.

The Wiedau begins near Bellen (a district of Brockel) in the vicinity of Hemslingen in the district of at the confluence of the Hahnenbach and the Mehlandsbach. In the area the Samtgemeinde Bothel, it flows through a densely wooded and near natural depression. It discharges into the Wümme in Rotenburg shortly after being joined by the only slightly smaller Rodau.

Water sport 
The Wiedau is popular with anglers and canoeists.

See also 
List of rivers of Lower Saxony

References

Rivers of Lower Saxony
Lüneburg Heath
Rotenburg (district)
Rivers of Germany